"Christmas Waltz" is the tenth episode of the fifth season of the American television drama series Mad Men and the 62nd episode of the series overall. It is written by Victor Levin and Matthew Weiner, and directed by Michael Uppendahl. It originally aired on the AMC channel in the United States on May 20, 2012.

The episode starts on Pearl Harbor Day (December 7) 1966. Harry Crane tries to help out old friend Paul Kinsey, who has fallen on hard times and become involved with Hare Krishna and a bohemian devotee girlfriend. Lane Pryce resorts to desperation and subterfuge while trying to solve his own cash problems. Don and Joan commiserate with each other over drinks after Joan is served divorce papers. Following their conversation, Don's interest in his work is re-ignited, as he dedicates himself to landing the Jaguar account.

While the episode was well-received, it was the lowest-rated episode of Mad Men since the penultimate episode of the third season. This episode also marks the first appearance of Paul Kinsey since the third season's finale "Shut the Door. Have a Seat".

Plot
Lane Pryce's attorney abroad instructs him to wire £2,900 (US$8,000) to England to cover back taxes within two days. Lane (Jared Harris) worries he cannot come up with the money. Harry (Rich Sommer) schedules coffee with Paul Kinsey (Michael Gladis), then reports a strong first-quarter outlook to Lane but warns that actual commitments from clients are still uncertain. Lane visits the firm's bank manager and convinces him to authorize a $50,000 credit extension.

Pete (Vincent Kartheiser) tells Don (Jon Hamm) and Roger (John Slattery) that Edwin Baker has been fired from Jaguar and their firm is back in contention for the account. Presentations will be in mid-January. Don comments on it being a lot of work, to which an annoyed Pete replies that Don "may have to work past 5:30".

Paul, wearing a robe and sporting a shaved head, greets Harry at a Hare Krishna gathering. He introduces his friend Lakshmi (Anna Wood), who convinces Harry to join them in a group chant. In a taxi after the gathering, Paul admits to Harry that he loves Lakshmi but the Krishna movement does not make him happy. Paul later hands Harry a spec script he wrote for Star Trek entitled "The Negron Complex" and asks Harry to pass it along to NBC. Hesitant, Harry agrees and later asks Peggy (Elisabeth Moss) for her opinion on Paul's script, which they agree is awful. She advises him to tell Paul the truth—that he can't write—but Harry is clearly reluctant.

Lane calls a partners meeting to announce they can hand out Christmas bonuses thanks to a $50,000 surplus; however, Don recommends waiting until the Christmas party. Pete agrees, explaining the Jaguar announcement will be a sufficient morale boost until then; this gets no response from anyone, frustrating Pete. In Joan's (Christina Hendricks) office, a drunken Roger says he wants to financially support her and Kevin. She refuses, claiming the child would be better off without Roger's involvement.

Megan (Jessica Paré) and Don watch the play America Hurrah, in which a character rants against TV advertisements. After the play, they argue about its negative portrayal of advertising.

Lane sneaks into the office after hours and forges Don's signature on a $7,500 check written out to himself. The next day, he assures his attorney that the funds are available, but hangs up when the attorney mentions his fee.

Pete asks Don to test drive a Jaguar for research purposes. Don agrees but declines Pete's suggestion to bring Megan.  Pete is again annoyed that no one seems interested in the fact that he has put them in the running for Jaguar.

Lakshmi shows up at the firm and seduces Harry in his office. He resists but gives in when she assures him that the movement allows it. Afterward, Lakshmi reveals that Paul is the movement's best recruiter and, subtly blackmailing Harry over what just happened, she tells Harry to stay away or he might turn Paul into a "gross materialist."

Joan is summoned to reception for a signature, but instead receives divorce papers from a process server. She loses her temper with Meredith, the receptionist, who had let the process server in, and smashes the model Mohawk airplane on Meredith's desk. Don leads her out of the office and takes her to a Jaguar showroom where they pretend to be a couple looking for a new car. Don offers the salesman a $6,000 deposit to let them test-drive an XK-E alone. At a bar, Joan reminisces about the days when, if she was called to reception, it was to receive flowers from various suitors. Don admits that, due to the sheer volume of flowers she received, he thought she was dating Aly Khan. She replies that her mother raised her to be admired, and then asks why Don never showed interest in her. He admits he was afraid of her, and that Burt Peterson had told him she was the one person in the agency he shouldn't cross. They discuss starting over and flirt. He points out a man at the other end of the bar who seems interested in her and she guesses the man has a wife. When he's ready to leave, Don offers to return the Jaguar by himself, slipping Joan some "mad money" in case it doesn't work out with the other man, and advising her to stand over by the jukebox: "That was a pretty good look before." Alone later in the Jaguar, Don furiously shifts gears and accelerates. The next day, Joan is delivered flowers from "Ali Khan," with a note stating that her mother did a good job.

Don arrives home drunk and finds an angry Megan at the dinner table. She throws her plate against the wall and asks where he's been. She yells that she has sat waiting for someone who does not care about anybody. She orders him to sit at the table and eat.

Rebecca (Embeth Davidtz) tells Lane she wants to visit England for Christmas. He claims the office needs him after Jaguar has renewed interest in the firm and he does not want to spend another Christmas alone.

Harry tells Paul that his business connection liked the script but passed on it, even though he didn't really show it to NBC. He gives Paul $500 and a ticket to Los Angeles, urging him to leave the Krishnas and start over. Paul hugs him, saying that Harry was the first person to do anything for him.

At the office, Pete informs the partners that Mohawk Airlines is suspending their advertising budget due to a machinist strike. When Lane protests cutting the bonuses entirely, the other partners agree to give bonuses only to the staff and defer their own. In the conference room, the partners inform the employees about Mohawk, Jaguar and the bonuses, only the last of which gets a response after Roger makes it clear that the employees are getting bonuses and the partners aren't. Don ends the meeting with a rally, saying that every Madison Avenue agency is defined by their first automobile client, and that when they obtain the Jaguar account, the world will know about SCDP. The room erupts in applause; Lane, however, is visibly uneasy as everyone files out.

Production
"Christmas Waltz" was written by Victor Levin and Matthew Weiner and directed by Michael Uppendahl. Of his character, Lane Pryce, Jared Harris said that "He is learning to behave the way the others behave. Your ego and your self-esteem is wrapped up in saying 'this is my area of expertise and I'll take care of it and don't you worry about it." Jon Hamm, elaborating on Don's motivation for the ending speech, said, "What drives him to that speech is part of his gradual creative reawakening and reinvigorating and really wanting to pay penance for writing the letter, and losing Lucky Strike, and trying to come through for people.

Reception

Critical reception
The episode was well-received by television journalists, with many praising the chemistry between Christina Hendricks and Jon Hamm. Emily VanDerWerff of The A.V. Club gave the episode an A- grade, adding that "'Christmas Waltz' sees the characters confronting materialism and consumerism itself, in a handful of separate plots. (Also, Lane Pryce continues to have the world's most depressing adventures.) Of course, one could argue the whole show is about people realizing that having something isn't going to make them happy. That's true, more or less, but 'Christmas Waltz' was damn direct about it at times." Tim Goodman called the episode "thoroughly entertaining" and pointed to the episode's "theme of elusive happiness", but expressed worry about how the series will wrap up several ongoing story threads involving Lane Pryce's financial woes, the Draper marriage, and the Betty Francis arc within the next three episodes. Alan Sepinwall of Hitfix praised the storylines involving Don and Joan's bond and Paul's return, but called Lane's journey the "sketchiest of the week, in the same way that his infatuation with the woman in the wallet was the one misstep in the season premiere."

Ratings
"Christmas Waltz" was watched by 1.92 million viewers and received an adult 18-49 rating of 0.6, marking the lowest numbers for the series since the third season.

Awards
"Christmas Waltz" was nominated for the Primetime Emmy Award for Outstanding Makeup for a Single-Camera Series (Non-Prosthetic).

References

External links
"Christmas Waltz" at AMC

2012 American television episodes
Mad Men (season 5) episodes
Television episodes directed by Michael Uppendahl